Zibda   is a Palestinian village in the Jenin Governorate.

History
Pottery sherds from the early and late Roman eras (20% + 25%),   Byzantine era (25%), and early Muslim (10%) and the Middle Ages  (15%) have been found here.

Zibda is possibly the place called Zebedellum in Crusader sources in the year 1200.

Ottoman era
Zibda, like the rest of Palestine, was incorporated into the Ottoman Empire in 1517, and in the census of 1596, the village appeared as Zabda, located in the nahiya of Sara in the liwa of Lajjun. It had a population of 26 households, all Muslim. They paid a fixes tax rate of 25% on agricultural products, including wheat, barley, summer crops, goats and beehives, in addition to occasional revenues and a tax on a press for olive oil or grape syrup; a total of 6,500 akçe. Pottery remains from the early Ottoman era (5%) have also been found here.

In 1838 Zebda  was noted as a village in the Jenin province, also called the  Haritheh esh-Shemaliyeh province. 

In 1882 the PEF's  Survey of Western Palestine (SWP) described Zebdah as "a ruined village with a well."

British Mandate era
In the 1922 census of Palestine conducted by the British Mandate authorities, Zabdah had a population 150 Muslims, decreasing in the 1931 census to 132 Muslim, in a total of 22 houses.

In the 1945 statistics,   the population of Zibda was 190 Muslims, with a total 11,924 dunams of land, according to an official land and population survey.  Of this, 1,136 dunams were used for plantations and irrigable land, 1,022 dunams were for cereals, while a total of 6,591 dunams were classified as non-cultivable land.

Jordanian era
Following the 1948 Arab–Israeli War, and the subsequent 1949 Armistice Agreements, Zibda came under Jordanian rule.

The Jordanian census of 1961 found 225 inhabitants.

Israeli occupation
Since the 1967 Six-Day War, Zibda has been occupied by Israel.

The village has two tombs within it.

References

Bibliography 

 
 

 
 
 

 (see also Tell esh-Sheikh Ṣabar, p. 285 ff and p. 78)

External links 
Welcome To Zibda
Zibda, Welcome to Palestine
Survey of Western Palestine, Map 8: IAA, Wikimedia commons

Villages in the West Bank
Jenin Governorate
Municipalities of the State of Palestine